is a Japanese football player, who plays for Iwate Grulla Morioka as a goalkeeper.

Career
Born and raised in Kobe, he never made an appearance for Vissel, despite growing in its youth ranks. After three seasons spent between Mito Hollyhock and FC Imabari, he signed for Grulla Morioka, where he played since 2012.

He made the news after scoring from his own net with a long-kick in a J3 match against Nagano Parceiro. He was sent on loan to Kyoto Sanga after little time spent on the field in 2015, but he came back to Grulla at the end of the season.

Club statistics
Updated to 23 February 2020.

References

External links

1988 births
Living people
Association football people from Hyōgo Prefecture
Japanese footballers
J1 League players
J2 League players
J3 League players
Vissel Kobe players
Mito HollyHock players
Iwate Grulla Morioka players
Kyoto Sanga FC players
Association football goalkeepers